Bulu is a village found in the Mangwe District of Zimbabwe. The village is separated from Ngwizi by the main road coming from Plumtree. The closest hospital to Bulu is Brunaburg and the closest police station is Mphoengs.  The closest town to Bulu is Plumtree.

History 
Bulu is named a man who was part of the missionaries. The current Headman for Bulu is Moses Nga Tshuma

Education 
Bulu has one secondary school, Bulu High and one primary school Bulu Primary. Based on 2020 academic results, Bulu Primary was ranked second best, coming behind Alan Redfern Primary which is located in Plumtree town.

References 

Mangwe District
Populated places in Zimbabwe